Albert Stern may refer to:

Albert Stern (violinist), American violinist
Albert Gerald Stern (1878–1966), British banker and secretary of the Landships Committee responsible for developing the first British tanks